The Teberan languages are a well established family of Papuan languages that Stephen Wurm (1975) grouped with the Pawaia language as a branch of the Trans–New Guinea phylum.

There are two Teberan languages, Dadibi and Folopa (Podopa). They are spoken in Southern Highlands Province and in adjoining provinces.

Classification
Malcolm Ross (2005) tentatively retains both Teberan and Pawaia within TNG, but sees no other connection between them. Noting insufficient evidence, Pawley and Hammarström (2018) tentatively leave Teberan as unclassified rather than as part of Trans-New Guinea.

Pawley and Hammarström (2018) do not consider there to be sufficient evidence for Teberan to be classified as part of Trans-New Guinea, though they do note the following lexical resemblances between the Teberan languages and proto-Trans-New Guinea.

Dadibi:
ami ‘breast’ < *amu

Folopa:
kabu ‘stone’ < *ka(mb,m)u[CV]
kolemane ‘star’ < *kala(a,i)m ‘moon’
kile ‘eye’ < *(ŋg,k)iti

According to Dryer (2022), based on a preliminary quantitative analysis of data from the ASJP database, Teberan is likely to be a subgroup of Trans–New Guinea.

Proto-language
Some lexical reconstructions by Usher (2020) are:

{| class="wikitable sortable"
! gloss !! Proto-Dadibi-Folopa !! Dadibi !! Folopa
|-
! head
| *tobo || tobo-lu || tobo
|-
! hair/feather
| *ni[g]i || nisi || niki
|-
! ear/hear
| *[w]odzo || olo ~ odo- || woso 'hear'; woseni 'ear'
|-
! eye
| *ge[…] || ge-du || kele
|-
! nose
| *gun… || guni || gunumu; kurumu
|-
! tongue
| *kamina || hamina || 
|-
! bone
| *di[l/r]i || dili || diri
|-
! skin/bark
| *wadz[i/e] || wali || wase
|-
! breast
| *ame || ame || ame
|-
! dog
| *j[o]wi || jowi ~ juwi || juwi
|-
! pig
| *kibu || kibu || hupu
|-
! bird
| *ba || ba || ba
|-
! egg/seed
| *ge || ge || ke
|-
! tree/wood
| *ni || ni || ni
|-
! woman/female
| *so || so || so
|-
! sun/day
| *s[u]g[a] || sogo || suka
|-
! water
| *wẽi || wẽ || wẽi
|-
! fire/sun
| *si[a] || sia || si
|-
! path/door
| *tũ || tũ || tũ ~ tu
|-
! eat/drink
| *nV- ||  || n-/nuku- (present)
|-
! one/another
| *me || me || me
|}

Vocabulary comparison
The following basic vocabulary words are from Macdonald (1973), as cited in the Trans-New Guinea database:

{| class="wikitable sortable"
! gloss !! Dadibi !! Folopa (Sopese dialect) !! Folopa (Bɔro dialect) !! Folopa (Suri dialect) !! Tebera
|-
! head
| tobudu || topo || tobo || dobo || tobuřo
|-
! hair
| tobudu nizi || topo neki || tobu nigi || dobu nigi || tobu nigi
|-
! ear
| ořo || woleke || usani || ořoge || ozini
|-
! eye
| gedu || kele || kɩle || geře || kʌle
|-
! nose
| guni || fopa ai || fobaʔai || fobai || gunumu
|-
! tooth
| kɛli || seřeke || sɛřɛge || sɛřɛge || sega̧
|-
! tongue
| hamiya || hape || habe || gonoma || habi
|-
! leg
| sa̧ga̧ || holȩke || ho̧ || hořoge || hɔ
|-
! louse
| no̧u̧ || doi || dui || dui || dui
|-
! dog
| yowi || ha̧u̧ || ha̧o̧ || ha̧o̧ || ha̧o̧
|-
! bird
| ba || ba || ba || ba || ba
|-
! egg
| ba ge || ba ke || ba ge || ba age || ba ge
|-
! blood
| kanimi || wi || fage || fage || fɛ̧
|-
! bone
| dili || təři || dʌři || dʌři || dɩli
|-
! skin
| tigiwali || tiki || sɛ̧ga̧i̧ || sɛ̧ga̧i̧ || sɛ̧ga̧i̧
|-
! breast
| ami || awa̧ || a̧u̧wa || tigi a̧i̧ || ami
|-
! tree
| ni || ni || ni || ni || ni
|-
! man
| bidi || hwȩ || hwi̧ || hwi̧ || hwi̧
|-
! woman
| we || šo || sou || sou || sou
|-
! sun
| giliga || suḳʷa || sugua || teřeuna || yȩ
|-
! moon
| podua || kasiapu || ha̧di || haři || koi
|-
! water
| a̧i̧; wȩ || ipi || wȩi̧ || wi̧ || wȩi̧
|-
! fire
| sia || si || si || si || si
|-
! stone
| mazigi || kapo || kʰani || gabo || kabo
|-
! name
| nogi || doi || doi || nimi || diai
|-
! eat
| tubo || nae || nai || nae || nugidabo
|-
! one
| dɛlɛli || peta̧ti || mɛ̧ || koři sali demo || mɛzazibo
|-
! two
| si || tapala tamo || tamu || damo || dabada damubo
|}

References

External links 
 Timothy Usher, New Guinea World, Proto–Dadibi–Folopa

 
Languages of Papua New Guinea
Teberan–Pawaian languages